The Sinking City is an action-adventure game developed by Frogwares and inspired by the works of horror fiction author H. P. Lovecraft. Set in the fictional city of Oakmont, Massachusetts during the 1920s, the story follows private investigator and war veteran Charles W. Reed as he searches for clues to the cause of the terrifying visions plaguing him, and becomes embroiled in the mystery of Oakmont's unrelenting flooding.

The Sinking City was released for Microsoft Windows, PlayStation 4 and Xbox One in June 2019, for Nintendo Switch in September 2019, for PlayStation 5 in February 2021 and for Xbox Series X and Series S in April 2021.

Gameplay 
The Sinking City is an open-world detective game with a third-person camera perspective. It features an investigation system in which the outcome of the player's quests will often be defined by how observant the players are when investigating different clues and pieces of evidence.

The town of Oakmont is made up of seven districts (Advent, Coverside, Grimhaven Bay, Oldgrove, Reed Heights, Salvation Harbor, and The Shells) which have all been affected by flooding to various degrees, and the player must use a boat to safely traverse the flooded streets to reach drier areas. The player can swim if necessary, but the water is infested and can fatally damage the player's health and sanity. The player also assembles an arsenal of tools and weapons, and at times must use them to kill otherworldly creatures and dispel hallucinations. However, as Oakmont is an isolated place with dwindling resources and deteriorating social order, bullets have replaced money as the preferred currency; expending too many bullets can leave the player unable to barter for desired items. Another major resource is sanity, which is spent on investigative powers used to reconstruct crime scenes and identify clues. Sanity slowly regenerates on its own, but can be replenished faster with antipsychotic drugs. Disturbing scenes and encounters can cause sudden, sharp drops in sanity, affecting the player's perception of the surrounding environment, and complete loss of sanity is fatal.

Plot 
The Sinking City takes place in the secluded city of Oakmont, Massachusetts in the 1920s, a place that is not marked on any map and few people know how to find due to its remoteness. Oakmont has a long history of association with the occult and many of its citizens are not only eccentric, but unabashed practitioners of occultism. Cultists in bloody ritual garb are an unremarkable sight on the streets alongside fishermen, average townsfolk, refugees from the destruction of nearby Innsmouth, the destitute and desperate and well-heeled members of the upper class. The town also developed its own unique dialect over the years, but the origin of many phrases is murky. Six months prior to the events of the game, Oakmont was inundated by a mysterious, persistent flood of supernatural origin that has submerged many of its streets and cut it off from the mainland. The Flood brought with it a dark force that inexorably instils hysteria and madness in the minds of the terrified citizens and the struggling city is on the brink of collapse. In addition, droves of people from outside Oakmont who were reported missing have been turning up in the town, drawn by haunting, unaccountable visions.

Charles Winfield Reed, a U.S. Navy sailor and World War I veteran turned private investigator, travels from Boston to Oakmont at the invitation of intellectual Johannes van der Berg to discover the cause of the nightmarish visions that have been plaguing him since the disappearance of the ship he served on, the USS Cyclops. These visions are shared by numerous other people and are reported most frequently in Oakmont. Reed is also hired by Robert Throgmorton, the influential and physically striking head of one of Oakmont's leading families who has also been studying the visions, to help uncover the cause of the Flood plaguing the town. While Reed pursues this investigation and others using extrasensory powers of observation seemingly bestowed by his visions, uncovering the shadowy history and seedy underbelly of Oakmont along the way, he must guard his sanity as it is eroded by the town's darkness, otherworldly creatures attracted to death called Wylebeasts and the use of his own powers.

Reed's search for answers ultimately unearths a plot by the Great Old Ones to purge humanity. Johannes van der Berg is revealed to be a guise used by Hastur, the King in Yellow, who lures potential Chosen to Oakmont in order to unseal the sunken temple of Cthygonnaar, which imprisons Cthylla, the secret daughter of Cthulhu and Idh-yaa as well as the source of the Flood, Wylebeasts and the nightmares. Once Cthylla is freed, she will give birth to Cthulhu's reincarnation, resulting in Oakmont drowning in the sea and the world being destroyed by the arrival of the other Great Old Ones.

Reed is faced with a choice, leading to one of three endings:
 He can abscond to Boston with the artifact used to awaken Cthylla in an attempt to prevent the apocalypse from ever coming to pass. 
 Commit suicide to leave his destiny as the Chosen unfulfilled and thus delay Cthylla's awakening for a few more centuries. 
 Accept his destiny and unleash Cthylla, who then consumes him and ascends to the surface.

It is implied that the fruition of Cthulhu's plan is inevitable even in the former two endings, as Reed is seen either witnessing or hallucinating Johannes arriving in Boston and flooding it, or Johannes is seen on the Oakmont docks awaiting another boat with another prospective Chosen.

Development and release 

When planning The Sinking City, developer Frogwares envisioned the open-world setting of Oakmont as a densely-built urban area that was two kilometers square. As the scope of this made handcrafting the entire town unfeasible, Frogwares turned to Unreal Engine 4 and followed the example of city generation techniques pioneered in Ubisoft's Assassin's Creed series to create entire blocks of Oakmont at once through procedural generation. These prefabricated blocks were assembled from assets based on actual early 20th century New England architecture, with blocks in different districts of Oakmont following different sets of rules to give each district a distinct purpose and atmosphere. Among the various generic blocks, the designers placed a number of unique buildings and landmarks, and also decorated the generic blocks with other assets by hand. The areas of the town designated for flooding also used unique assets in their generation, such as silt, seaweed, and barnacles, to make them stand out in their districts.

The Sinking City was announced by Frogwares on March 9, 2016, with pre-alpha gameplay footage debuting on July 28, 2017. The game was originally slated for release on March 21, 2019, but it was eventually delayed to June 27, 2019. Frogwares Community Manager Sergey Oganesyan explained that the decision to delay the game was made in order to avoid a crowded release window and allow for additional polishing time. Frogwares later announced that The Sinking City would be a one-year timed-exclusive release for the Epic Games Store on PC, but this would not affect the console releases. A Nintendo Switch port was self-published by Frogwares on September 12, 2019.

The release of the game for Microsoft Windows, PlayStation 4 and Xbox One was distributed by Bigben Interactive, which claimed to be the publisher but was only a distribution intermediary. The exact role of Bigben (and Focus Home Interactive previously) was explained by Frogwares CEO in an interview given to the French media Planète Aventure in February 2020, in which he explained that Frogwares had never worked with publishing companies. Bigben Interactive and Focus Home Interactive were only licensees which do not possess intellectual properties on the games.

Frogwares was previously working on Call of Cthulhu in collaboration with Focus Home Interactive.

Distributor dispute and delisting
Nacon (formally BigBen Interactive) was licensed to distribute the game until April 20, 2020. The contract was terminated by Frogwares, on account of both intellectual property violation and lack of payment. This resulted in The Sinking City being delisted from Steam, the Epic Games Store, and the Xbox One and PlayStation 4 digital storefronts on August 25, 2020 pending the resolution of Frogwares' legal dispute with BigBen. The Nintendo Switch version of the game remained available on the Nintendo eShop, as that version had been self-published by Frogwares. 
The game was republished onto Steam in February 2021 by Nacon. Frogwares quickly denounced this re-release of the game on Twitter claiming that it was not the version they created, accusing Nacon of using a version that was "hacked" from their version of the game to change out certain assets and mask its origins. Fans of the game began to review bomb the re-release, in support of Frogwares. Nacon asserted that they have financially met the terms of their contract with Frogwares and that the developers were trying to change the terms of the agreed-upon contract, and further that the contract stipulated that Nacon was the sole entity that could release the game on Steam, despite Frogwares' own attempts to release a version of the game without mention of Nacon. Nacon justified this clause in the contract for releasing the modified version of the game on Steam. Frogwares issued a DMCA takedown notice to have this version on Steam removed on March 2, 2021.

Reception 

The Sinking City received "mixed or average" reviews according to Metacritic. Reviewers generally praised the game's writing, worldbuilding, and the lack of hand-holding in finding and drawing conclusions from clues to solve cases, but criticized the combat as slow and frustrating, and noted multiple technical issues, such as overly long loading times and screen-tearing.

Jeff Marchiafava of Game Informer summarized: "The Sinking City shares all of the same problems of Frogwares' previous games, but it also capitalizes on the same strengths. Reed's cases offer up surprising twists and memorable moments, and flesh out a twisted world and cast of characters that I enjoyed learning about."

Accolades 
The game was nominated for "Best Action and Adventure Game" at The Independent Game Developers' Association Awards.

Notes

References

External links 

2019 video games
Action-adventure games
Psychological horror games
PlayStation 4 games
Single-player video games
Survival video games
Windows games
Xbox One games
Video games developed in Ukraine
Nacon games
Unreal Engine games
Open-world video games
Cthulhu Mythos video games
Detective video games
Video games set in the 1920s
Video games set in Massachusetts
Nintendo Switch games
Frogwares games